Queen Maya (Hangul: 마야 부인, Hanja: 摩耶夫人) was a member of the Silla royal house and the wife and queen consort to King Jinpyeong of Silla, 26th King of Silla. She was of the royal Kim clan. She was the mother of Queen Seondeok of Silla.

Genealogy

Ancestors

Family
For the lineage from Lady Maya's parents upwards, refer to the ancestry chart above 
Siblings: 
Lord Horim (虎林公 호림공) (579-?), 14th Pungwolju (603–609)
Lady Horin (護璘夫人 호린부인) 
Husband: King Jinpyeong 
Issue: 
 Princess Cheonmyeong (天明公主 천명공주, dates unknown), 1st daughter 
 Princess Deokman (德曼公主 덕만공주),   2nd daughter 
 Princess Seonhwa (善花/化公主 선화공주, dates unknown), 3rd daughter(There is constant debate over her identity.)

In popular culture
 Portrayed by Kim Hwa-ran in the 2005–2006 SBS TV series Ballad of Seodong.
 Portrayed by Yoon Yoo-sun and Park Soo-jin in the 2009 MBC TV series Queen Seondeok.
 Portrayed by Im Nan-hyung in the 2012–2013 KBS1 TV series The King's Dream.
 Portrayed in the 2021 WEBNOVEL titled QUEEN JINDEOK by author GLORIAN.C.REGNARE.

References 

Silla people
Royal consorts of Silla
Queen Seondeok of Silla
6th-century Korean women